Kaufman is an unincorporated community in Madison County, Illinois, United States.

History
Kaufman was a station on the Toledo, St. Louis and Western Railroad (commonly known as the Clover Leaf).

References

Unincorporated communities in Madison County, Illinois
Unincorporated communities in Illinois